The 2003 edition of The Winston was the second exhibition stock car race of the 2003 NASCAR Winston Cup Series and the 19th iteration of the event. The race was held on Saturday, May 17, 2003, in Concord, North Carolina at Lowe's Motor Speedway, a 1.5 miles (2.4 km) permanent quad-oval. The race took the scheduled 90 laps to complete. Within the final segment of the race, Hendrick Motorsports driver Jimmie Johnson would manage to make a charge to the front within the last 20 laps of the segment to earn a US$1,017,604 (adjusted for inflation, US$) payout and his first career The Winston victory. To fill out the top three, Roush Racing driver Kurt Busch and Joe Gibbs Racing driver Bobby Labonte would finish second and third, respectively.

Background 

Lowe's Motor Speedway is a motorsports complex located in Concord, North Carolina, United States 13 miles from Charlotte, North Carolina. The complex features a 1.5 miles (2.4 km) quad oval track that hosts NASCAR racing including the prestigious Coca-Cola 600 on Memorial Day weekend and the NEXTEL All-Star Challenge, as well as the UAW-GM Quality 500. The speedway was built in 1959 by Bruton Smith and is considered the home track for NASCAR with many race teams located in the Charlotte area. The track is owned and operated by Speedway Motorsports Inc. (SMI) with Marcus G. Smith (son of Bruton Smith) as track president.

Format and eligibility 
The popularity of the reality show Survivor influenced Winston to make changes to the format in 2002, adding a new elimination format ("Survival of the Fastest"), and the final segment returned to 20 laps to make tire wear an issue.

Only race winning drivers and owners from the previous year would be in the field, and all former Cup titleholders and the past five winners of The Winston would be added to the field, plus the winner of the qualifying races.

The No Bull Sprint was eliminated after 2002, and for 2003, The Winston Open would become a 20-lap race with pit stops, and then a 10 green flag lap sprint after pit stops.

If the caution flag waved on Lap 40 of the first segment, two green flag laps or the next yellow flag would be run to finish the segment.

In The Winston, only the top 20 cars advanced to the second segment, and 10 cars (in 2002) or 14 cars (in 2003 planned, but was 12 after crashes) advanced to the third segment.

A green flag pit stop for four tires was mandatory in the first segment, but after Frank Stoddard beat the system in 2002 by changing four tires on the car driven by Jeff Burton just feet from the finish line on the last lap, the rule was changed to mandating tire stops at a specific point in the race.

Also, the inversion is moved to the final 20 lap sprint, and the ten-minute break is restored between the second and final segment.

 Segment 1: 40 Laps / Must take a four-tire pit stop during race (In 2003, must be between Laps 10–30) / only top 20 cars advance.
 Segment 2: 30 Laps / Only 14 cars (2003) / 10 cars (2002) advance / full field inversion at end of segment
 Segment 3: 20 Green Flag Laps (no caution laps count)

Entry list

Winston Open

The Winston

Winston Open practice

First Winston Open practice 
The first practice for the Winston Open was held on Friday, May 16, at 1:30 PM EST. The session would last for 45 minutes.

Second Winston Open practice 
The second practice for the Winston Open was held on Friday, May 16, at 3:55 PM EST. The session would last for 45 minutes.

Final Winston Open practice 
The final practice for the Winston Open was held on Friday, May 16, after the preliminary 2003 Hardee's 200 NASCAR Craftsman Truck Series race. The session would last for 30 minutes.

The Winston practice

First The Winston practice 
The first practice for The Winston was held on Friday, May 16, at 2:20 PM EST. The session would last for 45 minutes.

Second The Winston practice 
The second practice for The Winston was held on Friday, May 16, at 4:45 PM EST. The session would last for 45 minutes.

Final The Winston practice 
The final practice for The Winston was held on Friday, May 16, at 10:30 PM EST. The session would last for 30 minutes.

Qualifying

The Winston Open 
Qualifying for the Winston Open was held on Friday, May 16, at 6:05 PM EST. Each driver would have two laps to set a fastest time; the fastest of the two would count as their official qualifying lap.

The Winston 
Qualifying for The Winston was held on Friday, May 16, at 8:05 PM EST. Each driver would run 3 laps each, with each driver having to do a mandatory pit stop following the driver's first or second lap.

Winston Open results

The Winston results

References 

2003 NASCAR Winston Cup Series
NASCAR races at Charlotte Motor Speedway
May 2003 sports events in the United States
2003 in sports in North Carolina
NASCAR All-Star Race